Krasnopavlivka is an urban-type settlement in Lozova Raion of Kharkiv Oblast in Ukraine. It is located on the left bank of the Orilka, a tributary of the Oril in the drainage basin of the Dnieper. The Dnieper - Donbas canal, which follows the Orilka, is dammed as Krasnopavlivka Reservoir. Krasnopavlivka belongs to Lozova urban hromada, one of the hromadas of Ukraine. Population:

Economy

Transportation
Krasnopavlivka railway station, located in the settlement, is on the railway connecting Kharkiv with Synelnykove via Lozova and Pavlohrad. There is some passenger traffic.

The settlement is connected by road with Kharkiv and with Pavlohrad where it has further access via highways with Dnipro and Zaporizhzhia.

References

Urban-type settlements in Lozova Raion